José Rui de Pina Aguiar (born 6 November 1964), known as José Rui, is a Cape Verdean retired footballer who played as a central defender, and is the current assistant coach of the Cape Verde national team.

Playing career
Born in Praia, Zé Rui started playing organized football at nearly 23 years of age, and spent his entire professional career in Portugal, his first club being União Sport Clube in the second division. He subsequently represented O Elvas C.A.D. and U.D. Leiria, competing in the second and third levels from 1990 to 1993.

Zé Rui made his debut in the Primeira Liga in the 1993–94 season, starting in 18 of his 21 appearances to help C.F. Os Belenenses finish in 13th position. After another campaign he moved to Vitória de Setúbal, helping to promotion from division two in his first year.

Zé Rui retired in June 2002 at almost 38, after two seasons with amateurs C.D. Beja. For several years he acted as assistant to the Cape Verde national team, even being in charge for the friendly with Portugal on 27 May 2006 after Carlos Alhinho's resignation.

References

External links

1964 births
Living people
Sportspeople from Praia
Cape Verdean footballers
Association football defenders
Primeira Liga players
Liga Portugal 2 players
Segunda Divisão players
O Elvas C.A.D. players
U.D. Leiria players
C.F. Os Belenenses players
Vitória F.C. players
C.D. Beja players
Cape Verde international footballers
Cape Verdean expatriate footballers
Expatriate footballers in Portugal
Cape Verdean expatriate sportspeople in Portugal
Cape Verdean football managers
Cape Verde national football team managers